Lake Villa Community Consolidated School District 41 is a school district based in Lake Villa, Lake County, Illinois. District 41 governs four schools in total: three elementary schools (B. J. Hooper Elementary School, Olive C. Martin Elementary School, and William L. Thompson Elementary School) and one middle school (Peter J. Palombi Middle School). The superintendent of Lake Villa School District 41 is Dr. Lynette Zimmer.

References

External links

Palombi Middle School
Hooper Elementary School
Martin Elementary School
Thompson Elementary School

School districts in Lake County, Illinois